The Erie Canal Museum is a historical museum about the Erie Canal located in Syracuse, New York. The museum was founded in 1962 and is a private, non-profit corporation. It is housed in the Syracuse Weighlock Building dating from 1850.  The Syracuse Weighlock Building was in operation as a weighlock from 1850 to 1883.  In 1883 the canal decided to stop charging tolls.  The weighlock building was essentially used as a big, elaborate scale to weigh the boats traveling on the Erie Canal and determine how much each boat would pay for a toll.  Today the museum includes not only artifacts from the Erie Canal, but also a gallery of present canal life.  It is the mission of the museum to help people to learn the rich history of the Erie Canal and that it is not just a thing of the past, but still very much exists today in different forms.

The museum's Weighlock Building was listed on the National Register of Historic Places in 1971.

History of the Weighlock Building
The Weighlock Building was constructed in 1850.   After the canal stopped charging tolls in 1883 the building had many different uses.  By 1940 the State Department of Public Works was using the building. Since 1962, the building has been occupied by the Erie Canal Museum.

History of the museum
The museum was founded in 1962 by an active group of citizens that wanted to preserve the historic weighlock building.

Collections

The Syracuse Weighlock Building itself is the largest and perhaps most significant artifact in the museum's collection.  The Erie Canal Museum was founded in 1962 in an effort to save the Syracuse Weighlock Building from demolition. Today the Erie Canal Museum building is the only surviving weighlock from the Erie Canal.

When the weighlock was in operation boats could pass from the canal right into the lock chamber in the Syracuse Weighlock Building.  The lock would let the water out after a boat entered and the full weight of the boat would come to rest on the scales.  The weight of the boat was used to determine the amount of the toll that a boat would have to pay. 
To get an accurate weight for each load the weight of the boat itself, as listed on the Empty Weight Certificate of the boat, would be subtracted from its weight as measured in the weighlock.

The museum has the Frank Buchanan Thomson, a full size replica line boat, on display in what was previously the lock chamber of the Weighlock.  Today there is no water, but it is easy to imagine what it looked like in the past.

When the museum opened in 1962 it did not have any collection and has acquired its collection slowly and carefully over the years. In addition to the building the boat the museum has over 50,000 items in their collection.   Today the museum has a large collection of all things related to the operation of the Erie Canal, lateral canals, and other man made waterways

According to the museum's website, the collections include, “approximately: 1,400 objects (costumes, furnishings, tools, commemorative and documentary items, canal boat equipment, models, and household items); 1,500 prints; 950 sketches and drawings; 45 paintings; 39,000 photographs and negatives; 100 glass plate negatives; 200 rare books; and, miscellaneous maps, plans, receipts, and other manuscript and archival material.”

Today
The museum today is a popular destination for tour groups traveling through Syracuse, NY.  The Erie Canal Museum also serves as the Syracuse Visitor's Center. The museum has lectures and events throughout the year.  Be sure to check out the Annual Gingerbread Gallery each winter and the ongoing After Hours events Wednesday nights at the museum, during the summer.

There are eight parking spots for Museum visitors located in the New York State parking lot under the highway overpass with entrances on North State Street and on James Street. The spots are labeled “Visitor Center Parking.” Parking is also available on-street surrounding the Museum and in nearby parking lots.

The Erie Canal Museum is dedicated to preserving and showcasing the 1850 National Register Weighlock Building, the last remaining structure of its kind, and to telling the incredible adventure story of the Erie Canal. Come aboard a full size replica canal boat. Explore life in a canal town. Put on a puppet show. Experience a part of history that played an imperative role in the growth and development of the United States. The Erie Canal Museum is a must-see for adults and children of all ages!

The Erie Canal Museum is partially funded by the New York State Council on the Arts with the support of Governor Kathy Hochul and the New York State Legislature.

Admission to the Museum is by donation. A $10.00 donation is suggested.

The Weighlock Building and the Erie Canal Museum can also offer a unique setting for all types of functions, day or evening. You could host your next party, reception or meeting in the indoor or outdoor spaces available.

See also 
 Erie Canalway National Heritage Corridor
 New York State Canalway Trail
 Old Erie Canal State Historic Park
 List of maritime museums in the United States

References

External links

Canal museums in the United States
Erie Canal in Syracuse, New York
Erie Canal parks, trails, and historic sites
Historic American Buildings Survey in New York (state)
Maritime museums in New York (state)
Museums established in 1962
Museums in Syracuse, New York
National Register of Historic Places in Syracuse, New York
Transportation buildings and structures on the National Register of Historic Places in New York (state)
Water transportation buildings and structures on the National Register of Historic Places